Visa requirements for Monégasque citizens are administrative entry restrictions by the authorities of other states placed on citizens of Monaco. As of 13 April 2021, Monégasque citizens had visa-free or visa on arrival access to 175 countries and territories, ranking the Monégasque passport 14th overall (tied with Chile) in terms of travel freedom according to the Henley Passport Index, making it the highest ranking passport of any European country not belonging to either the European Union or EFTA.

Visa requirements map

Visa requirements

Dependent, disputed, or restricted territories

Visa requirements for Monégasque citizens for visits to various territories, disputed areas, partially recognized countries and restricted zones:

Vaccination
Many African countries, including Angola, Benin, Burkina Faso, Cameroon, Central African Republic, Chad, Democratic Republic of the Congo, Republic of the Congo, Côte d'Ivoire, Equatorial Guinea, Gabon, Ghana, Guinea, Liberia, Mali, Mauritania, Niger, Rwanda, São Tomé and Príncipe, Senegal, Sierra Leone, Uganda, Zambia require all incoming passengers to have a current International Certificate of Vaccination. Some other countries require vaccination only if the passenger is coming from an infected area.

Passport validity
Many countries require passport validity of no less than 6 months and one or two blank pages.

See also

 Visa policy of Monaco
 Visa policy of the Schengen Area
 Monégasque passport
 Foreign relations of Monaco

References and notes
References

Notes

Monaco
Foreign relations of Monaco